Juan Bautista Cabrera Ibarz (sometimes spelled Ivars; 23 April 1837 – 18 May 1916) was the founding bishop of the Spanish Reformed Episcopal Church, originally the Spanish Reformed Church. He was also a Freemason, poet, theologian and translator, especially of Anglican works.

Biography
Born on April 23, 1837 in Benissa, he was ordained a priest of the Piarist order in 1853. Having been influenced by Protestant ideas through correspondence, he sought refuge in Gibraltar in the summer of 1863. He married there and frequented both Methodist and Anglican churches.

After the Revolution of 1868 he returned to Spain and pastored a church in Seville. In 1880 a synod in Seville organized what would become the Spanish Reformed Episcopal Church, which is today a member of the Anglican Communion. The Church's liturgy incorporated Anglican and Mozarabic elements with some novel material composed by Cabrera himself. Throughout his career he composed lyrics for multiple existing tunes and translated other hymns to Spanish. 

In 1894, Cabrera was consecrated as a bishop by three bishops of the Church of Ireland, including William Plunket, Archbishop of Dublin. He served as bishop of the Spanish Reformed Church until his death and died in 1916 in Madrid.

See also 
 Anglicanism in Spain

References

1837 births
1916 deaths
Converts to Anglicanism from Roman Catholicism
Spanish Anglicans
Spanish bishops
Spanish Freemasons
People from the Province of Alicante
19th-century Anglican theologians
20th-century Anglican theologians